Warship is a British television drama series produced by the BBC and broadcast between 1973 and 1977. The series was set contemporaneously and depicted life on board the fictitious Royal Navy frigate HMS Hero. Four series were produced with 45 episodes made in total.

It was also subtitled into Dutch and broadcast in the Netherlands as Alle hens aan dek (All hands on deck) and it enjoyed popularity in Britain, Ireland, Australia, New Zealand and Singapore.

Plot
The episodes were written and filmed to reflect the reality of life in the Royal Navy and the Royal Marines in the 1970s. The primary focus for most stories was on the Captain and his fellow officers, but the series also featured life on the lower decks to portray episodes heavily featuring ratings. Episodes featured a variety of events at sea (the Cold War, smuggling, the evacuation of civilians from crisis-hit places, etc.), as well as the personal lives of officers and ratings and the impact their personal lives had on their professional lives and duties.

Cast
Over the course of the series HMS Hero's crew changes periodically. Only two officers, Kiley and Wakelin, remain with the ship for the whole series. The main characters in most episodes were the captain and his first lieutenant.

Hero's crew

Captains 

 Donald Burton as Commander Mark Nialls,  (series 1–2)
 Bryan Marshall as Commander Alan Douglas Glenn,  (series 3)
 Derek Godfrey as Captain Edward Kelvin Holt (series 4)

First Lieutenants 

 David Savile as Lieutenant Commander Derek "Porky" Beaumont (series 1–3)
 Robert Morris as Lieutenant Commander James Napier,  (series 4)

Other officers

 John Lee as Lieutenant Commander Bill Kiley, weapons and electrics officer
 Graeme Eton as Lieutenant Montgomery Charles "Monty" Wakelin, supply officer
 Norman Eshley as Lieutenant Bob Last, navigating officer (series 1–2)
 Andrew Burt as Lieutenant Paul Peek, navigating officer (series 3–4)
 Christopher Coll as Lieutenant Peter Boswall, flight commander (series 1)
 James Leith as Lieutenant Roy Tagg, flight commander (series 3)
 Richard Warwick as Lieutenant Parry (series 1)
 Rex Robinson as Lieutenant Commander Jack Junnion, engineer officer (series 1)

Ratings 

 Don Henderson as Master-at-Arms Frank Heron (series 1–3)
 Frank Jarvis as Master-at-Arms Harry Burnett (series 3–4)
 James Cosmo as Leading Regulator Pat Fuller
 Nigel Humphreys as Leading Seaman Anderson
 Steve Gardner as Able Seaman Billy Grogan
 Colin Rix as Leading Medical Assistant Milner

Recurring characters 

 Donald Hewlett as Rear Admiral Mulliner/Staunton
 Peter Cellier as Captain Reginald St Vincent Calder, Squadron Commander
 Marian Diamond as Sue Herrick, Glenn's girlfriend (series 3)
Prunella Ransome as Zoe Carter, Holt's girlfriend (series 4)

Royal Navy and Royal Australian Navy co-operation

The series enjoyed close collaboration between the Royal Navy and the BBC, and—unusually for a TV drama of the 1970s—looked like a documentary.

This Australian link and Australian broadcasts of Warship influenced the production of the later and similar Australian Broadcasting Corporation series Patrol Boat.

The crews of these frigates - and Derwent - were given Hero cap tallies for filming purposes, and their ships were given HMS Hero ships' badges, name plates and lifebuoys. Similarly, their Westland Wasp helicopters from the Fleet Air Arm's 829 Naval Air Squadron were all repainted with the identification HMS Hero, the code 471, and the nickname "The Fighting Forty-Two". Among the Wasps used for the fictional Hero Flight were serial numbers XT419 from HMS Phoebes Flight, XV625, and XV626. These measures, along with the use by all the frigates of the pennant number F42, had the unintended side effect of confusing Soviet spy ships.

Other Royal Navy warships used for the series included the aircraft carrier , the helicopter cruiser , the commando carrier  and the submarine .

Fleet Air Arm squadrons embarked on HMS Ark Royal used for filming included the Buccaneer S 2s of 809 Naval Air Squadron and the Phantom FG 1s of 892 Naval Air Squadron. The Westland Wessex HU 5s of 845 Naval Air Squadron embarked on HMS Bulwark also featured in some episodes.

The series was also filmed ashore in, among other places, Gibraltar, Malta, Hong Kong, Singapore, north-east of Isfjellet in Loppa and Larvik in Norway, the Admiralty Experiment Works in Haslar, RNAS Predannack, Portland Harbour, Plymouth Dockyard, Portsmouth Dockyard and South Uist.

Theme music
The opening and closing music of the series were taken from a march called Warship, composed for the series by Anthony Isaac. The theme was played by the Band of the Royal Marines, Deal, conducted by Lieutenant Colonel Paul Neville, MVO, FRAM, RM. (See links to files of opening and closing music below.)

The march is still played by Royal Marine bands and the Royal Australian Navy Band. The theme influenced the opening bars of a 2010 march,  Scrap Iron Flotilla, composed by Leading Seaman Martyn Hancock of the Royal Australian Navy Band.

Warship was chosen as one of the pieces performed to mark the 75th and 100th anniversaries of the founding of the Royal Australian Navy Band. Writing in the Centenary Concert Music Program in 2013, the Royal Australian Navy's then-Director of Music, Lieutenant Commander Paul Cottier, said that:

 "Warship is a fine example of the influence television and film were having on the repertoire of military bands at that time, which were beginning to see a change in direction from military music and orchestral transcriptions to more popular and contemporary music."'

Series creators
The originator of the idea for the series and main script editor was a serving Royal Navy officer, Ian Mackintosh, who worked with BBC producer Anthony Coburn after Mackintosh originally approached the BBC in May 1971. Coburn had for some years wanted to produce a series "that would do for the Navy what Z-Cars had done for the Police". Apart from Mackintosh, other scriptwriters included Michael J. Bird, and the series was directed by Michael E. Briant among others. Mackintosh was seconded to the BBC for the series, and was awarded the MBE for his work on Warship in 1976.

Warship and Blue Peter
In 1975 the BBC's children's television programme Blue Peter included a feature about the filming of Warship at Plymouth Dockyard aboard HMS Danae; the item was presented by Lesley Judd. The next year, future Blue Peter presenter Peter Duncan played a major role in the episode "All of One Company". Six episodes of Warship were filmed aboard HMS Danae around that time.

Warship assessed in retrospect
Writing in 2006, historian Professor S.P. MacKenzie judged that:

 "Warship had succeeded where Making Waves failed because those involved – the multi-talented Ian Mackintosh above all – managed to create varied and interesting characters and plots in which RN frigates and other vessels served as useful backdrops for the action. Warship, in short, helped the Royal Navy through a combination of competent writing, acting and direction rather more than through using its equipment as a showcase. (...) Mackintosh and those around him knew how to draw in the viewer with stories that were both contemporary and interesting." (Broadcasting the New Navy: the BBC-TV Series Warship (1973–1977), p.119)

Making Waves was a 2004 series made by ITV, and intended to be in the same vein as Warship.  It proved less successful, and only three episodes were shown out of the six that were made.

In 2022 the British Forces Broadcasting Service noted that Warship was "extremely popular ... and it is still fondly remembered to this day".

Products based on Warship

Books
Ian Mackintosh wrote three books based on the series, which were simultaneously published in hardback and paperback. The books were:
 Warship (published in 1973)
 HMS Hero (published in 1976)
 Holt RN (published in 1977) – same story as episode 4.01 "Wind Song"

Board game
Series creator Ian Mackintosh also devised a version of the board game Battleships, based on his experience of modern naval tactics and called Warship after the series. It was produced by Merit Toys in 1976, in association with the BBC.

Scale model kit

Theme music single

Columbia Records released a 7-inch single (catalogue reference DB 8998) of the theme music (see above) in 1973. As in the TV series the theme was played by the Band of the Royal Marines, Deal, conducted by Lieutenant Colonel Paul Neville, MVO, FRAM, RM.

Availability on DVD
The first series of Warship was released on DVD in September 2014, with the second series being released 9 November 2015.

Episode list

Series 1

Series 2

Series 3

Series 4

See also
 Patrol Boat (TV series)
 "Making Waves" (2004 ITV series based upon "Warship")
Warship (2010 TV series) (2010 Channel 5 documentary series with same name as "Warship")

References

External links
 Royal Navy History
 Warship Episode Guide on TV.com website
 British Film Institute site on Warship
 Royal Navy leaflet on Warship, from the HMS Phoebe Association website
 Westland Wasp 471 at the Royal Naval Air Engineering and Survival School, HMS Sultan
 Service records noting two of the several Westland Wasps painted as 471 for Warship
 Memories of HMAS Derwent as HMS Hero 
 Comments on Warship by series Director Michael Briant
 Webpage (at Home > Scriptwriting > Warship) about Michael J Bird's scripts for Warship
 1977 article from the Australian magazine TV Week about Warship
 Discussion board about Warship with much information on the series, including episode descriptions
 Warship opening music
 Warship closing music
 Picture of Airfix Warship scale model kit box
 Article about building Airfix Warship scale model kit
 Pictures of completed Airfix Warship scale model kit
 HMS Phoebe Association website
 HMS Dido Association website 
 HMS Danae website 
 HMS Jupiter Association website
 HMS Hermione Association website 
 Ian Mackintosh's Royal Navy service record on Opsroom.org 
 

1970s British drama television series
1973 British television series debuts
1977 British television series endings
BBC television dramas
Leander-class frigates
Royal Navy
British drama television series
British military television series
Australian Broadcasting Corporation original programming
Dutch drama television series
English-language television shows